The 1971–72 St. John's Redmen basketball team represented St. John's University during the 1971–72 NCAA University Division men's basketball season. The team was coached by Frank Mulzoff in his second year at the school. St. John's home games are played at Alumni Hall and Madison Square Garden.

Roster

Schedule and results

|-
!colspan=9 style="background:#FF0000; color:#FFFFFF;"| Regular Season

|-
!colspan=9 style="background:#FF0000; color:#FFFFFF;"| NIT Tournament

Team players drafted into the NBA

References

St. John's Red Storm men's basketball seasons
St. John's
St. John's
St John
St John